Luis del Cerro (7 May 1924 – 30 April 2019) was a Spanish sport shooter who competed in the 1968 Summer Olympics, the 1972 Summer Olympics, the 1976 Summer Olympics and in the 1984 Summer Olympics.

References

1924 births
2019 deaths
Spanish male sport shooters
Olympic shooters of Spain
Shooters at the 1968 Summer Olympics
Shooters at the 1972 Summer Olympics
Shooters at the 1976 Summer Olympics
Shooters at the 1984 Summer Olympics
Sportspeople from Barcelona
20th-century Spanish people